The 2014 Gambian coup d'état attempt broke out during the night of 30 December 2014, when gunfire erupted in the Gambian capital of Banjul.

Background
At the time of the coup attempt President Yahya Jammeh had run away and was out of the country, with sources differing on whether he was in France or Dubai. Jammeh, who himself came to power in the 1994 Gambian coup d'état, had experienced several attempted coups against his regime, and sometimes accused the United Kingdom and the United States of being behind said attempts. Previously in November 2014, Jammeh condemned the European Union for its response to increasingly harsh anti-LGBT discrimination under his government. The following month those same measures caused the United States to drop The Gambia from one of its trade programmes.

Planning 
In 2013, President Jammeh removed the commander of his Presidential Guard, Lieutenant Colonel Lamin Sanneh. Sanneh then fled to Washington, D.C. where he met fellow refugee from the Gambia and former officer of the Kentucky National Guard Njaga Jagne. Sanneh, Jagne, and a few others soon conceived a plot to overthrow President Jammeh.

Jagne convinced Cherno Nije, a Texan entrepreneur also from the Gambia, to help fund the project. Jagne also recruited Papa Faal, Alhagie Boye, other Gambians, and veterans of the United States Army, as well as several Gambians living in Europe. Banka Manneh, another Gambian refugee who was Sanneh's friend, claimed he would be able to gather a force of 160 soldiers from inside The Gambia to assist in the coup.

Events
On December 30, 2014, the gunmen recruited by the plotters attacked the State House of the Gambia, the official presidential residence. Local media quickly identified them as having entered the country from neighbouring Senegal under the command of Lt Col. Lamin Sanneh. The gunmen engaged in heavy fire with government forces. Soldiers blocked several points of entry to the city and a full blackout of the state radio and television was placed into effect.

The fighting diminished later during the day. Banks and other businesses remained closed while state radio played traditional music, mentioning nothing of the night's events. Four people, including Sanneh and Njaga Jagne, were killed, and several more were injured.

With the gunmen failing to consolidate control, the coup failed. Jammeh returned to The Gambia the following day. Jammeh reshuffled his cabinet on January 10.

Aftermath
After the coup failed, Papa Faal, one of the co-conspirators, entered the United States embassy in Dakar, Senegal seeking protection. However, he was instead interrogated. On January 1, 2015, the United States Federal Bureau of Investigation raided homes in Georgia, Kentucky, Minnesota, and Texas as part of an investigation into the coup. That same weekend, the FBI also raided the offices of a Texas development firm. The owner of the Texas firm, Cherno Nije, was arrested at Washington Dulles International Airport and charged with violating the successor statute to the Neutrality Act of 1794. During the raid on Nije's home in Texas, the FBI found a manifesto entitled “Gambia Reborn: A Charter for Transition from Dictatorship to Democracy and Development,” as well as a spreadsheet detailing the coup attempt's $221,000 budget funded by Nije, who was a millionaire. Faal was also charged and later pleaded guilty. Two others, Alagie Barrow of Tennessee and Banka Manneh of Georgia, were also charged. Both later pleaded guilty as well.

The Washington Post later revealed that the FBI had interviewed Sanneh at his home in Maryland and thereafter tipped off Senegalese officials about the plot through the State Department.

It was reported on 2 April 2017 that the corpses of three alleged conspirators, Lamin Sanneh, Alagie Nyass and Njaga Jagne were discovered by Gambian police after the fall of the Jammeh regime.

See also

1994 Gambian coup d'état
Dawda Jawara
 History of the Gambia
 LGBT rights in the Gambia

References

Gambia
Attempted coups d'état in the Gambia
Gambian coup d'état attempt
Politics of the Gambia
Coup d'état attempt
Gambian coup d'état attempt